Samuel Fitch (July 1701 – 1787)  was a member of the House of Representatives of the Colony of Connecticut from Norwalk in the sessions of May 1736, October 1741, May and October 1742, May 1743, May and October 1744, May and October 1745, May and October 1746, May and October 1747, May 1748, May and October 1750, May 1751, May and October 1752, October 1753, May 1754, October 1760, May 1761.

He was the son of Thomas Fitch III (1675–1731), and brother of Governor Thomas Fitch.

He was a New England King's Commissioner, and a large land proprietor. He inherited the tract of land which adjoins the harbor to the east of Gregory Point.

On May 27, 1743, he was named auditor of the colonial treasury.

References 

1701 births
1787 deaths
Connecticut Comptrollers
Members of the Connecticut House of Representatives
Politicians from Norwalk, Connecticut
People of colonial Connecticut
18th-century American politicians